Nueno is a municipality located in the province of Huesca, Aragon, Spain. According to the 2008 census (INE), the municipality had a population of 524 inhabitants.

List of villages in the municipality
 Arascués
 Belsué
 Nocito
 Santa Eulalia de la Peña

References

Municipalities in the Province of Huesca